The 1994 AFL season was the 98th season of the Australian Football League (AFL), the highest level senior Australian rules football competition in Australia, which was known as the Victorian Football League until 1989. The season featured fifteen clubs, ran from 26 March until 1 October, and comprised a 22-game home-and-away season followed by a finals series featuring the top eight clubs – an increase from the six clubs which had contested the finals in previous years.

The premiership was won by the West Coast Eagles for the second time, after it defeated  by 80 points in the 1994 AFL Grand Final.

Foster's Cup

 15.12 (102) defeated  9.14 (68) in the final.

Rule changes
There were several significant alterations to the laws of the game brought in for the 1994 season:
 The number of interchange players was increased from two to three which, when added to the "run on" team of 18 on-the-field players, increased the standard team squad size to 21 players.
 The number of field umpires was increased from two to three.
 Playing time was reduced from 25 minutes per quarter to 20 minutes, but additional stoppages (including all scores and boundary throw-ins) attracted  "time-on" allocations; the total reduction of playing time was approximately 10%.
 The size of each club's senior playing list was significantly reduced from 52 to 42 players from the 1994 season (with the exception of the struggling , which was granted a list of 50 players). Victorian clubs could list ten players on a supplementary list to make up the numbers in their reserves teams, but those players were not eligible for AFL senior selection. The change was part of an AFL Commission plan to completely abolish the Victorian clubs' reserves competition by 1995, but this final stage did not occur until 2000.
 Advertising was permitted for the first time on the backs of guernseys. Small sponsors' logos had previously been permitted over the breast and on the shorts, but the new regulations allowed for logos 30 cm long and 8 cm high below the number on the back of the guernsey, which has since become the prime advertising location on guernseys. Under the original rules, the logo was required to be consistent with the colour of the guernsey, a stipulation which has since been relaxed.

Premiership season

Round 1

|- bgcolor="#CCCCFF"
| Home team
| Home team score
| Away team
| Away team score
| Ground
| Crowd
| Date
|- bgcolor="#FFFFFF"
||| 17.12 (114) |||| 16.7 (103) ||Victoria Park|| 25,602 ||Saturday 26, March
|- bgcolor="#FFFFFF"
||| 17.11 (113) |||| 17.9 (111) ||Whitten Oval || 18,592 ||Saturday 26, March
|- bgcolor="#FFFFFF"
||| 15.7 (97) |||| 23.15 (153) ||Waverley Park || 29,582 ||Saturday 26, March
|- bgcolor="#FFFFFF"
||| 12.10 (82) |||| 11.13 (79) ||MCG || 39,492 ||Saturday 26, March
|- bgcolor="#FFFFFF"
||| 26.18 (174) |||| 16.13 (109) ||MCG || 39,741 ||Sunday 27, March
|- bgcolor="#FFFFFF"
||| 13.21 (99) |||| 12.17 (89) ||Gabba|| 7,901 ||Sunday 27, March
|- bgcolor="#FFFFFF"
||| 22.18 (150) |||| 13.6 (84) ||Football Park || 44,953 ||Sunday 27, March

Round 2

|- bgcolor="#CCCCFF"
| Home team
| Home team score
| Away team
| Away team score
| Ground
| Crowd
| Date
|- bgcolor="#FFFFFF"
||| 17.10 (112) |||| 14.15 (99) ||Optus Oval|| 24,872 ||Saturday 2, April
|- bgcolor="#FFFFFF"
||| 21.16 (142) |||| 10.13 (73) ||MCG || 27,195 ||Saturday 2, April
|- bgcolor="#FFFFFF"
||| 8.16 (64) |||| 17.16 (118) ||Waverley Park || 29,581 ||Saturday 2, April
|- bgcolor="#FFFFFF"
||| 14.13 (97) |||| 11.12 (78) ||Subiaco Oval || 28,228 ||Sunday 3, April
|- bgcolor="#FFFFFF"
||| 20.14 (134) |||| 11.6 (72) ||MCG || 15,333 ||Sunday 3, April
|- bgcolor="#FFFFFF"
||| 22.20 (152) |||| 8.16 (64) ||Kardinia Park || 24,019 ||Monday 4, April
|- bgcolor="#FFFFFF"
||| 9.12 (66) |||| 14.16 (100) ||MCG || 85,063 ||Monday 4, April

Round 3

|- bgcolor="#CCCCFF"
| Home team
| Home team score
| Away team
| Away team score
| Ground
| Crowd
| Date
|- bgcolor="#FFFFFF"
||| 25.23 (173) |||| 6.10 (46) ||MCG || 36,726 ||Friday 8, April
|- bgcolor="#FFFFFF"
||| 16.12 (108) |||| 14.10 (94) ||Waverley Park || 30,454 ||Saturday 9, April
|- bgcolor="#FFFFFF"
||| 17.9 (111) |||| 12.6 (78) ||Whitten Oval || 8,829 ||Saturday 9, April
|- bgcolor="#FFFFFF"
||| 5.9 (39) |||| 20.15 (135) ||MCG || 19,609 ||Saturday 9, April
|- bgcolor="#FFFFFF"
||| 14.15 (99) |||| 10.10 (70) ||Optus Oval|| 28,496 ||Sunday 10, April
|- bgcolor="#FFFFFF"
||| 14.11 (95) |||| 12.22 (94) ||MCG || 38,307 ||Sunday 10, April
|- bgcolor="#FFFFFF"
||| 21.9 (135) |||| 24.10 (154) ||SCG|| 11,068 ||Sunday 10, April

Round 4

|- bgcolor="#CCCCFF"
| Home team
| Home team score
| Away team
| Away team score
| Ground
| Crowd
| Date
|- bgcolor="#FFFFFF"
||| 11.20 (86) |||| 10.12 (72) ||SCG|| 9,727 ||Friday 15, April
|- bgcolor="#FFFFFF"
||| 11.7 (73) |||| 24.16 (160) ||Waverley Park || 30,944 ||Saturday 16, April
|- bgcolor="#FFFFFF"
||| 14.15 (99) |||| 17.10 (112) ||Whitten Oval || 21,630 ||Saturday 16, April
|- bgcolor="#FFFFFF"
||| 9.12 (66) |||| 12.12 (84) ||MCG || 61,193 ||Saturday 16, April
|- bgcolor="#FFFFFF"
||| 18.21 (129) |||| 8.5 (53) ||WACA|| 28,980 ||Saturday 16, April
|- bgcolor="#FFFFFF"
||| 22.19 (151) |||| 15.8 (98) ||Gabba|| 11,290 ||Sunday 17, April
|- bgcolor="#FFFFFF"
||| 15.14 (104) |||| 11.11 (77) ||Football Park || 45,638 ||Sunday 17, April

Round 5

|- bgcolor="#CCCCFF"
| Home team
| Home team score
| Away team
| Away team score
| Ground
| Crowd
| Date
|- bgcolor="#FFFFFF"
||| 17.15 (117) |||| 4.6 (30) ||MCG || 20,946 ||Friday 22, April
|- bgcolor="#FFFFFF"
||| 17.18 (120) |||| 15.15 (105) ||Kardinia Park || 23,490 ||Saturday 23, April
|- bgcolor="#FFFFFF"
||| 20.17 (137) |||| 20.9 (129) ||Whitten Oval || 10,514 ||Saturday 23, April
|- bgcolor="#FFFFFF"
||| 14.14 (98) |||| 14.10 (94) ||MCG || 74,330 ||Saturday 23, April
|- bgcolor="#FFFFFF"
||| 13.15 (93) |||| 17.8 (110) ||Football Park || 44,426 ||Sunday 24, April
|- bgcolor="#FFFFFF"
||| 8.10 (58) |||| 19.15 (129) ||Subiaco Oval || 27,357 ||Sunday 24, April
|- bgcolor="#FFFFFF"
||| 10.10 (70) |||| 15.22 (112) ||Waverley Park || 37,870 ||Monday 25, April

Round 6

|- bgcolor="#CCCCFF"
| Home team
| Home team score
| Away team
| Away team score
| Ground
| Crowd
| Date
|- bgcolor="#FFFFFF"
||| 20.14 (134) |||| 11.8 (74) ||Optus Oval|| 22,810 ||Saturday 30, April
|- bgcolor="#FFFFFF"
||| 8.7 (55) |||| 9.6 (60) ||Waverley Park || 47,211 ||Saturday 30, April
|- bgcolor="#FFFFFF"
||| 13.8 (86) |||| 18.15 (123) ||MCG || 27,022 ||Saturday 30, April
|- bgcolor="#FFFFFF"
||| 17.8 (110) |||| 18.13 (121) ||Gabba|| 9,457 ||Saturday 30, April

Round 7

|- bgcolor="#CCCCFF"
| Home team
| Home team score
| Away team
| Away team score
| Ground
| Crowd
| Date
|- bgcolor="#FFFFFF"
||| 12.16 (88) |||| 11.9 (75) ||Waverley Park || 33,927 ||Saturday 7, May
|- bgcolor="#FFFFFF"
||| 20.13 (133) |||| 13.14 (92) ||Optus Oval|| 14,614 ||Saturday 7, May
|- bgcolor="#FFFFFF"
||| 8.10 (58) |||| 13.12 (90) ||MCG || 34,601 ||Saturday 7, May
|- bgcolor="#FFFFFF"
||| 17.7 (109) |||| 16.14 (110) ||SCG|| 9,295 ||Sunday 8, May
|- bgcolor="#FFFFFF"
||| 18.16 (124) |||| 13.18 (96) ||MCG || 52,342 ||Sunday 8, May
|- bgcolor="#FFFFFF"
||| 12.14 (86) |||| 7.7 (49) ||Whitten Oval || 12,181 ||Sunday 8, May
|- bgcolor="#FFFFFF"
||| 16.19 (115) |||| 6.13 (49) ||Subiaco Oval || 26,676 ||Sunday 8, May

Round 8

|- bgcolor="#CCCCFF"
| Home team
| Home team score
| Away team
| Away team score
| Ground
| Crowd
| Date
|- bgcolor="#FFFFFF"
||| 16.11 (107) |||| 20.15 (135) ||MCG || 50,227 ||Friday 13, May
|- bgcolor="#FFFFFF"
||| 25.16 (166) |||| 10.7 (67) ||Waverley Park || 12,233 ||Saturday 14, May
|- bgcolor="#FFFFFF"
||| 13.12 (90) |||| 17.17 (119) ||Whitten Oval || 11,334 ||Saturday 14, May
|- bgcolor="#FFFFFF"
||| 19.13 (127) |||| 11.12 (78) ||MCG || 35,851 ||Saturday 14, May
|- bgcolor="#FFFFFF"
||| 13.13 (91) |||| 14.10 (94) ||MCG || 28,559 ||Sunday 15, May
|- bgcolor="#FFFFFF"
||| 9.17 (71) |||| 25.15 (165) ||SCG|| 11,142 ||Sunday 15, May
|- bgcolor="#FFFFFF"
||| 20.11 (131) |||| 13.10 (88) ||Optus Oval|| 28,626 ||Sunday 15, May

Round 9

|- bgcolor="#CCCCFF"
| Home team
| Home team score
| Away team
| Away team score
| Ground
| Crowd
| Date
|- bgcolor="#FFFFFF"
||| 17.19 (121) |||| 13.10 (88) ||MCG || 72,216 ||Friday 20, May
|- bgcolor="#FFFFFF"
||| 21.16 (142) |||| 11.12 (78) ||Kardinia Park || 22,777 ||Saturday 21, May
|- bgcolor="#FFFFFF"
||| 14.13 (97) |||| 16.10 (106) ||MCG || 19,333 ||Saturday 21, May
|- bgcolor="#FFFFFF"
||| 7.20 (62) |||| 9.9 (63) ||Waverley Park || 40,080 ||Saturday 21, May
|- bgcolor="#FFFFFF"
||| 7.10 (52) |||| 12.11 (83) ||Whitten Oval || 14,923 ||Saturday 21, May
|- bgcolor="#FFFFFF"
||| 7.6 (48) |||| 22.13 (145) ||Football Park || 44,403 ||Sunday 22, May
|- bgcolor="#FFFFFF"
||| 11.9 (75) |||| 8.14 (62) ||Waverley Park || 15,249 ||Sunday 22, May

Round 10

|- bgcolor="#CCCCFF"
| Home team
| Home team score
| Away team
| Away team score
| Ground
| Crowd
| Date
|- bgcolor="#FFFFFF"
||| 14.17 (101) |||| 10.15 (75) ||WACA|| 27,901 ||Friday 27, May
|- bgcolor="#FFFFFF"
||| 16.13 (109) |||| 13.19 (97) ||Optus Oval|| 23,691 ||Saturday 28, May
|- bgcolor="#FFFFFF"
||| 4.8 (32) |||| 15.16 (106) ||Waverley Park || 19,914 ||Saturday 28, May
|- bgcolor="#FFFFFF"
||| 16.14 (110) |||| 10.14 (74) ||Victoria Park|| 26,718 ||Saturday 28, May
|- bgcolor="#FFFFFF"
||| 16.16 (112) |||| 15.11 (101) ||MCG || 75,129 ||Saturday 28, May
|- bgcolor="#FFFFFF"
||| 17.18 (120) |||| 12.21 (93) ||Gabba|| 10,953 ||Sunday 29, May
|- bgcolor="#FFFFFF"
||| 15.13 (103) |||| 9.10 (64) ||Football Park || 42,915 ||Sunday 29, May

Round 11

|- bgcolor="#CCCCFF"
| Home team
| Home team score
| Away team
| Away team score
| Ground
| Crowd
| Date
|- bgcolor="#FFFFFF"
||| 12.8 (80) |||| 20.15 (135) ||Waverley Park || 19,090 ||Saturday 4, June
|- bgcolor="#FFFFFF"
||| 24.10 (154) |||| 17.6 (108) ||Optus Oval|| 22,547 ||Saturday 4, June
|- bgcolor="#FFFFFF"
||| 15.11 (101) |||| 19.12 (126) ||Kardinia Park || 18,599 ||Saturday 4, June
|- bgcolor="#FFFFFF"
||| 13.12 (90) |||| 8.19 (67) ||Victoria Park|| 27,390 ||Saturday 4, June
|- bgcolor="#FFFFFF"
||| 20.5 (125) |||| 8.13 (61) ||Waverley Park || 22,895 ||Sunday 5, June
|- bgcolor="#FFFFFF"
||| 16.10 (106) |||| 19.12 (126) ||SCG|| 11,182 ||Sunday 5, June
|- bgcolor="#FFFFFF"
||| 11.8 (74) |||| 18.10 (118) ||MCG || 31,324 ||Sunday 5, June

Round 12

Round 13

|- bgcolor="#CCCCFF"
| Home team
| Home team score
| Away team
| Away team score
| Ground
| Crowd
| Date
|- bgcolor="#FFFFFF"
||| 22.13 (145) |||| 10.5 (65) ||Optus Oval|| 22,927 ||Saturday 18, June
|- bgcolor="#FFFFFF"
||| 7.11 (53) |||| 10.6 (66) ||Waverley Park || 17,599 ||Saturday 18, June
|- bgcolor="#FFFFFF"
||| 9.18 (72) |||| 10.7 (67) ||MCG || 26,917 ||Saturday 18, June
|- bgcolor="#FFFFFF"
||| 20.14 (134) |||| 9.6 (60) ||Whitten Oval || 13,070 ||Sunday 19, June
|- bgcolor="#FFFFFF"
||| 17.12 (114) |||| 11.15 (81) ||Gabba|| 18,484 ||Sunday 19, June
|- bgcolor="#FFFFFF"
||| 18.13 (121) |||| 12.12 (84) ||MCG || 27,699 ||Sunday 19, June
|- bgcolor="#FFFFFF"
||| 11.17 (83) |||| 12.6 (78) ||Football Park || 41,189 ||Sunday 19, June

Round 14

|- bgcolor="#CCCCFF"
| Home team
| Home team score
| Away team
| Away team score
| Ground
| Crowd
| Date
|- bgcolor="#FFFFFF"
||| 13.10 (88) |||| 15.16 (106) ||MCG || 45,177 ||Friday 24, June
|- bgcolor="#FFFFFF"
||| 21.18 (144) |||| 6.4 (40) ||Whitten Oval || 16,085 ||Saturday 25, June
|- bgcolor="#FFFFFF"
||| 9.8 (62) |||| 11.12 (78) ||MCG || 32,528 ||Saturday 25, June
|- bgcolor="#FFFFFF"
||| 12.7 (79) |||| 11.13 (79) ||Waverley Park || 13,868 ||Saturday 25, June
|- bgcolor="#FFFFFF"
||| 10.15 (75) |||| 14.9 (93) ||Kardinia Park || 21,939 ||Saturday 25, June
|- bgcolor="#FFFFFF"
||| 19.15 (129) |||| 14.11 (95) ||MCG || 27,094 ||Sunday 26, June
|- bgcolor="#FFFFFF"
||| 17.19 (121) |||| 11.11 (77) ||Gabba|| 18,881 ||Sunday 26, June

Round 15

|- bgcolor="#CCCCFF"
| Home team
| Home team score
| Away team
| Away team score
| Ground
| Crowd
| Date
|- bgcolor="#FFFFFF"
||| 19.14 (128) |||| 7.7 (49) ||WACA|| 24,632 ||Friday 1, July
|- bgcolor="#FFFFFF"
||| 11.19 (85) |||| 14.8 (92) ||MCG || 50,141 ||Saturday 2, July
|- bgcolor="#FFFFFF"
||| 16.19 (115) |||| 11.13 (79) ||Waverley Park || 35,267 ||Saturday 2, July
|- bgcolor="#FFFFFF"
||| 9.11 (65) |||| 16.15 (111) ||Whitten Oval || 8,484 ||Saturday 2, July
|- bgcolor="#FFFFFF"
||| 22.12 (144) |||| 6.10 (46) ||Optus Oval|| 21,119 ||Saturday 2, July
|- bgcolor="#FFFFFF"
||| 10.13 (73) |||| 13.15 (93) ||SCG|| 13,083 ||Sunday 3, July
|- bgcolor="#FFFFFF"
||| 12.11 (83) |||| 13.12 (90) ||Football Park || 43,052 ||Sunday 3, July

Round 16

|- bgcolor="#CCCCFF"
| Home team
| Home team score
| Away team
| Away team score
| Ground
| Crowd
| Date
|- bgcolor="#FFFFFF"
||| 11.14 (80) |||| 19.15 (129) ||Whitten Oval || 15,394 ||Saturday 9, July
|- bgcolor="#FFFFFF"
||| 22.13 (145) |||| 17.13 (115) ||Kardinia Park || 23,687 ||Saturday 9, July
|- bgcolor="#FFFFFF"
||| 21.16 (142) |||| 11.12 (78) ||Waverley Park || 25,037 ||Saturday 9, July
|- bgcolor="#FFFFFF"
||| 14.13 (97) |||| 12.22 (94) ||MCG || 49,878 ||Saturday 9, July
|- bgcolor="#FFFFFF"
||| 15.20 (110) |||| 21.9 (135) ||SCG|| 5,728 ||Sunday 10, July
|- bgcolor="#FFFFFF"
||| 11.14 (80) |||| 5.14 (44) ||Subiaco Oval || 29,723 ||Sunday 10, July
|- bgcolor="#FFFFFF"
||| 20.16 (136) |||| 10.16 (76) ||Optus Oval|| 29,695 ||Sunday 10, July

Round 17

|- bgcolor="#CCCCFF"
| Home team
| Home team score
| Away team
| Away team score
| Ground
| Crowd
| Date
|- bgcolor="#FFFFFF"
||| 17.10 (112) |||| 11.8 (74) ||Optus Oval|| 14,096 ||Saturday 16, July
|- bgcolor="#FFFFFF"
||| 17.11 (113) |||| 13.7 (85) ||Whitten Oval || 23,953 ||Saturday 16, July
|- bgcolor="#FFFFFF"
||| 8.7 (55) |||| 17.14 (116) ||Waverley Park || 21,097 ||Saturday 16, July
|- bgcolor="#FFFFFF"
||| 7.12 (54) |||| 14.13 (97) ||MCG || 85,831 ||Saturday 16, July
|- bgcolor="#FFFFFF"
||| 24.9 (153) |||| 12.17 (89) ||MCG || 33,265 ||Sunday 17, July
|- bgcolor="#FFFFFF"
||| 12.12 (84) |||| 15.8 (98) ||Gabba|| 14,936 ||Sunday 17, July
|- bgcolor="#FFFFFF"
||| 12.10 (82) |||| 11.12 (78) ||Football Park || 42,860 ||Sunday 17, July

Round 18

|- bgcolor="#CCCCFF"
| Home team
| Home team score
| Away team
| Away team score
| Ground
| Crowd
| Date
|- bgcolor="#FFFFFF"
||| 10.15 (75) |||| 13.9 (87) ||Football Park || 43,788 ||Friday 22, July
|- bgcolor="#FFFFFF"
||| 13.9 (87) |||| 7.13 (55) ||Whitten Oval || 25,540 ||Saturday 23, July
|- bgcolor="#FFFFFF"
||| 15.10 (100) |||| 18.2 (110) ||MCG || 38,858 ||Saturday 23, July
|- bgcolor="#FFFFFF"
||| 9.5 (59) |||| 15.9 (99) ||Waverley Park || 26,936 ||Saturday 23, July
|- bgcolor="#FFFFFF"
||| 8.17 (65) |||| 7.16 (58) ||Gabba|| 8,236 ||Sunday 24, July
|- bgcolor="#FFFFFF"
||| 13.12 (90) |||| 8.6 (54) ||Waverley Park || 42,930 ||Sunday 24, July
|- bgcolor="#FFFFFF"
||| 14.17 (101) |||| 7.11 (53) ||Subiaco Oval || 26,020 ||Sunday 24, July

Round 19

|- bgcolor="#CCCCFF"
| Home team
| Home team score
| Away team
| Away team score
| Ground
| Crowd
| Date
|- bgcolor="#FFFFFF"
||| 15.12 (102) |||| 12.10 (82) ||MCG || 32,845 ||Friday 29, July
|- bgcolor="#FFFFFF"
||| 21.9 (135) |||| 8.10 (58) ||MCG || 43,132 ||Saturday 30, July
|- bgcolor="#FFFFFF"
||| 5.15 (45) |||| 8.7 (55) ||Waverley Park || 12,927 ||Saturday 30, July
|- bgcolor="#FFFFFF"
||| 15.14 (104) |||| 9.18 (72) ||Optus Oval|| 25,265 ||Saturday 30, July
|- bgcolor="#FFFFFF"
||| 14.11 (95) |||| 9.8 (62) ||MCG || 23,906 ||Sunday 31, July
|- bgcolor="#FFFFFF"
||| 13.13 (91) |||| 5.8 (38) ||Kardinia Park || 15,383 ||Sunday 31, July
|- bgcolor="#FFFFFF"
||| 3.8 (26) |||| 13.14 (92) ||Whitten Oval || 5,334 ||Sunday 31, July

Round 20

|- bgcolor="#CCCCFF"
| Home team
| Home team score
| Away team
| Away team score
| Ground
| Crowd
| Date
|- bgcolor="#FFFFFF"
||| 19.20 (134) |||| 17.4 (106) ||MCG || 76,565 ||Friday 5, August
|- bgcolor="#FFFFFF"
||| 12.21 (93) |||| 9.7 (61) ||MCG || 33,503 ||Saturday 6, August
|- bgcolor="#FFFFFF"
||| 11.11 (77) |||| 10.18 (78) ||Optus Oval|| 26,014 ||Saturday 6, August
|- bgcolor="#FFFFFF"
||| 15.10 (100) |||| 7.12 (54) ||Waverley Park || 16,328 ||Saturday 6, August
|- bgcolor="#FFFFFF"
||| 12.12 (84) |||| 14.15 (99) ||Gabba|| 12,341 ||Sunday 7, August
|- bgcolor="#FFFFFF"
||| 17.16 (118) |||| 4.10 (34) ||Whitten Oval || 17,591 ||Sunday 7, August
|- bgcolor="#FFFFFF"
||| 9.12 (66) |||| 13.16 (94) ||SCG|| 6,513 ||Sunday 7, August

Round 21

|- bgcolor="#CCCCFF"
| Home team
| Home team score
| Away team
| Away team score
| Ground
| Crowd
| Date
|- bgcolor="#FFFFFF"
||| 10.13 (73) |||| 9.10 (64) ||WACA|| 31,948 ||Friday 12, August
|- bgcolor="#FFFFFF"
||| 10.12 (72) |||| 17.15 (117) ||Waverley Park || 14,653 ||Saturday 13, August
|- bgcolor="#FFFFFF"
||| 8.11 (59) |||| 13.22 (100) ||Optus Oval|| 11,388 ||Saturday 13, August
|- bgcolor="#FFFFFF"
||| 9.10 (64) |||| 13.14 (92) ||MCG || 49,872 ||Saturday 13, August
|- bgcolor="#FFFFFF"
||| 9.16 (70) |||| 8.14 (62) ||SCG|| 9,622 ||Sunday 14, August
|- bgcolor="#FFFFFF"
||| 11.23 (89) |||| 18.9 (117) ||MCG || 52,562 ||Sunday 14, August
|- bgcolor="#FFFFFF"
||| 13.11 (89) |||| 12.14 (86) ||Football Park || 36,599 ||Sunday 14, August

Round 22

|- bgcolor="#CCCCFF"
| Home team
| Home team score
| Away team
| Away team score
| Ground
| Crowd
| Date
|- bgcolor="#FFFFFF"
||| 12.11 (83) |||| 15.13 (103) ||MCG || 32,951 ||Friday 19, August
|- bgcolor="#FFFFFF"
||| 17.12 (114) |||| 11.15 (81) ||Waverley Park || 13,454 ||Saturday 20, August
|- bgcolor="#FFFFFF"
||| 10.9 (69) |||| 19.15 (129) ||Whitten Oval || 12,122 ||Saturday 20, August
|- bgcolor="#FFFFFF"
||| 15.17 (107) |||| 16.8 (104) ||MCG || 66,555 ||Saturday 20, August
|- bgcolor="#FFFFFF"
||| 20.16 (136) |||| 12.12 (84) ||MCG || 49,354 ||Sunday 21, August
|- bgcolor="#FFFFFF"
||| 13.10 (88) |||| 14.14 (98) ||Gabba|| 10,572 ||Sunday 21, August
|- bgcolor="#FFFFFF"
||| 19.12 (126) |||| 8.14 (62) ||Optus Oval|| 28,038 ||Sunday 21, August

Round 23

|- bgcolor="#CCCCFF"
| Home team
| Home team score
| Away team
| Away team score
| Ground
| Crowd
| Date
|- bgcolor="#FFFFFF"
||| 25.10 (160) |||| 10.14 (74) ||MCG || 17,960 ||Friday 26, August
|- bgcolor="#FFFFFF"
||| 25.11 (161) |||| 6.12 (48) ||Optus Oval|| 32,486 ||Saturday 27, August
|- bgcolor="#FFFFFF"
||| 14.6 (90) |||| 13.10 (88) ||Waverley Park || 40,154 ||Saturday 27, August
|- bgcolor="#FFFFFF"
||| 16.15 (111) |||| 15.9 (99) ||Kardinia Park || 22,208 ||Saturday 27, August
|- bgcolor="#FFFFFF"
||| 16.15 (111) |||| 11.5 (71) ||Whitten Oval || 23,615 ||Saturday 27, August
|- bgcolor="#FFFFFF"
||| 13.13 (91) |||| 15.12 (102) ||Gabba|| 13,718 ||Sunday 28, August
|- bgcolor="#FFFFFF"
||| 17.13 (115) |||| 8.10 (58) ||Football Park || 41,669 ||Sunday 28, August

Round 24

Ladder
All teams played 22 games during the home and away season, for a total of 165. An additional 9 games were played during the finals series. It was the first season that the AFL implemented a top 8 team finals series.

Ladder progression

Finals

The second McIntyre "final six" system, which had operated in 1992 and 1993, was replaced by the McIntyre "final eight" system. The McIntyre "final eight" system would be used until 1999 and was then replaced by the AFL’s Amended "final eight" system in 2000.

Week one

Semi finals

|- bgcolor="#CCCCFF"
| Home team
| Score
| Away team
| Score
| Venue
| Attendance
| Date
|- bgcolor="#FFFFFF"
| 
| 15.15 (105)
| 
| 10.12 (72)
| Waverley Park
| 53,160
| Saturday, 17 September
|- bgcolor="#FFFFFF"
| 
| 21.18 (144)
| 
| 9.11 (65)
| MCG
| 65,577
| Sunday, 18 September

Preliminary Final

|- bgcolor="#CCCCFF"
| Home team
| Score
| Away team
| Score
| Venue
| Attendance
| Date
|- bgcolor="#FFFFFF"
| 
| 14.19 (103)
| 
| 16.13 (109)
| MCG
| 80,121
| Saturday, 24 September
|- bgcolor="#FFFFFF"
| 
| 16.21 (117)
| 
| 8.4 (52)
| WACA
| 34,317
| Saturday, 24 September

Grand final

|- bgcolor="#CCCCFF"
| Home team
| Score
| Away team
| Score
| Venue
| Attendance
| Date
|- bgcolor="#FFFFFF"
| 
| 20.23 (143)
| 
| 8.15 (63)
| MCG
| 93,860
| Saturday, 1 October

Awards

Notable events
 moved its match-day home ground from Princes Park (which, due to the first ever ground naming rights deal affecting an AFL venue, became known as Optus Oval from this season) to the Western Oval. However, this left  as the sole tenant of Optus Oval, and an existing arrangement between Carlton and the AFL required eighteen matches to be played there during the year; consequently, Fitzroy and the MCG's four co-tenants (and ) were each forced to play one or two home games at Optus Oval to make up the balance.
 Starting from Round 20, the "blood rule" was introduced in order to allay fears raised by the threat of AIDS. Under the rule, any bleeding player would be sent from the field by the umpires until his wound had been covered or closed and any blood-stained gear replaced. The rule, which for the first time ever gave umpires the ability to order players from the ground, was not initially well-received – particularly following a Round 23 incident in which  ruckman Stephen Lawrence was unable to return to the field after the third quarter because Hawthorn officials could not find a spare sock to replace his bloodstained one.
 The MCG became Collingwood's predominant home ground for the first time, however they would still play sporadic home games at Victoria Park until 1999 against mostly low crowd drawing and/or interstate opposition. To this day, the MCG has remained Collingwood's predominant home ground.

See also
 McIntyre "final eight" system

References

External Links
 1994 Season - AFL Tables

 
AFL season
Australian Football League seasons